is a railway station in the city of Ōfunato in Iwate Prefecture, Japan, jointly operated by East Japan Railway Company (JR East), the third-sector operator Sanriku Railway, and the freight operator Iwate Development Railway.

Lines
The station is also served by the Iwate Development Railway Company for freight operations.

Station layout 
Sakari Station has one side platform and one island platform connected to the station building by a footbridge. The station is staffed, and the JR East portion of the station has a Midori no Madoguchi ticket office.

Platforms

History 

Sakari Station opened on 19 September 1935 as a station on the Ōfunato Line. The Iwate Development Railway Company Hikoroichi Line connected to the station on 21 October 1950 and the Akasaki Line from 21 June 1957. The Minami-Rias Line began operations on 1 March 1970. The Minami-Rias Line was privatized to the Sanriku Railway Company on 1 April 1984, and the Ōfunato Line was privatized on 1 April 1987, becoming part of JR East.

During the 11 March 2011 Tōhoku earthquake and tsunami, the station was flooded and part of the tracks on both the Ōfunato Line and Minami-Rias Line were swept away, thus suspending services. Services between Yoshihama and  resumed on 5 April 2014.

Minami-Rias Line, a portion of Yamada Line, and Kita-Rias Line constitute Rias Line in 23 March 2019. Accordingly, the station became terminus of Rias Line.

Surrounding area 
 Ōfunato City Hall
 Ōfunato Post Office
National Route 45
National Route 107

See also
 List of railway stations in Japan

External links 

 JR East station information 
 Sanriku Railway station information

References

Railway stations in Iwate Prefecture
Railway stations in Japan opened in 1935
Ōfunato Line
Ōfunato, Iwate